In category theory, if  is a category and  is a set-valued functor, the category  of elements of  (also denoted ) is the following category:
 Morphisms  are arrows  of  such that .

The category of elements of a presheaf 
In some texts (e.g. Mac Lane, Moerdijk) the category of elements is used for presheaves. We state it explicitly for completeness.
 Morphisms  are arrows  of  such that .

As one sees, the direction of the arrows is reversed. One can, once again, state this definition in a more concise manner: the category  just defined is nothing but .

In fact, using the Yoneda lemma one can show that , where  is the Yoneda embedding.

The category of elements of an operad algebra 
Given a (colored) operad  and a functor, also called an algebra, one obtains a new operad, called the category of elements and denoted , generalizing the above story for categories. It has the following description: 
 An arrow  is an arrow  in  such that

See also 
 Grothendieck construction

References

External links
 

Representable functors